The BL 13.5 inch naval gun Mk I ("67-ton gun") was Britain's first successful large breechloading naval gun, initially designed in the early 1880s and eventually deployed in the late 1880s. Mks I - IV were all of 30 calibres length and of similar construction and performance.

United Kingdom service

Royal Navy service

The gun was designed to match the new large guns of the French  battleships. Development and manufacture occurred far slower than intended. The Howe and the Rodney were laid down to the same dimensions as the preceding , which was designed for 12 in 45 ton guns. The Anson and Camperdown were laid down later, to greater dimensions. All four ships carried their 13.5 in guns in twin barbettes on the centreline at each end of the superstructure.

The guns also equipped the subsequent  laid down in 1886 and s laid down in 1889.

Coast defence service
A single Mk III gun was mounted as a disappearing gun for coast defence at Penlee Battery, Plymouth.

Italian service

Construction
The gun was made up of the following parts:
A tube,
Breech-piece,
B hoop,
B tube,
1- and 2-C hoops,
C tube,
1- and 2D hoops, and
Jacket.
Construction was as follows:
The breech-piece, B hoop and B tube were shrunk over the A tube, extending to the muzzle.
The 1-C hoop was shrunk over the breech-piece.  The 1-C hoop and the breech-piece were connected longitudinally by a screwed steel bush at the breech end. The bush was prepared for receiving the breech screw.
The C tube and 2-C hoop were shrunk over the B hoop and B tube.
The 1-D hoop was shrunk round the 1-C hoop and part of the C tube.  This was secured at the breech end by a screwed steel ring.
The 2-D hoop was shrunk over the C tube immediately in front of the 1 D hoop.
The jacket was shrunk round the 1-D hoop at the breech.
Thrust collars were formed on the outside of the 1-D hoop and were used to secure the gun to the gun-mounting (the gun did not have trunnions).
The gun had a hydraulically-operated interrupted-screw breech-block. The breech-block was completely detached from the gun during loading (because there was no carrier).

The guns were designed and manufactured by Woolwich Arsenal.  There were significant delays in the manufacture of the guns in the 1880s, which inordinately delayed the completion of the first four battleships equipped with them. The cause of the delays was "the faulty principle of placing liners in the bores which cracked during proof and it took a long time to repair these and make the guns efficient."

Operating characteristics
The gun fired a  projectile using  brown powder (SBC) propellant. The calibre radius head (crh) of the projectiles was nominally two.

In the Admiral and Trafalgar classes the maximum elevation was 13 degrees. In the Royal Sovereign class and the Hood the maximum elevation was 13.5 degrees.

The projectiles used a copper driving band to engage the rifling.  Once a gun had fired about 100-110 rounds with full (brown powder) charges, the rifling became worn near the breech, such that it was necessary to augment the width of the driving bands.  Ships were therefore issued with "augmenting strips", which were long strips of copper that were hammered partially into the recessed ring around the projectile (cannelure) that held the driving band.  Once guns were too worn for augmenting strips to help, the guns were sent back to the factory to be relined.  Wear was lower when firing reduced charges.

Under favourable circumstances, two 13.5 in guns in a mounting on the Anson could fire "in a couple of minutes or even less".

See also
 List of naval guns

Weapons of comparable role, performance and era
 340mm/28 Modèle 1881 gun French equivalent

Notes

References

Bibliography
 Text Book of Gunnery , 1902. London: Printed for His Majesty's Stationery Office, by Harrison and Sons, St. Martin's Lane
 Naval Gunnery, by Captain H Garbett RN, pub George Bell & sons, 1897.
 British Battleships, by Oscar Parkes, first published Seeley Service & Co, 1957, published United States Naval Institute Press, 1990.

External links

 Tony DiGiulian, British 13.5"/30 (34.3 cm) Marks I, II, III and IV
 Diagram showing gun on disappearing mounting, as mounted at Penlee Battery, Plymouth at Victorian Forts and Artillery website

Naval guns of the United Kingdom
Naval guns of Italy
340 mm artillery
Elswick Ordnance Company
Coastal artillery
Victorian-era weapons of the United Kingdom